John Richard Bell IV (born May 18, 1979) is an American politician and Republican member of the North Carolina House of Representatives. He has represented the 10th district (including constituents in Wayne, Greene, and Johnston counties) since 2013.

Early life and education
John Richard Bell, IV is the child of John R. "Ricky" Bell, III, and Cindy Ezzell Bell.  He has one sister. His father was a highway maintenance engineer for the North Carolina Department of Transportation.
Bell graduated from the University of North Carolina, Wilmington, in 2001.

Career
In 2016, Bell was a business development employee for North Carolina Community Federal Credit Union in Goldsboro, North Carolina. He later joined Sentinel Risk Advisors as a client executive.

In January 2016, Bell endorsed Senator Marco Rubio in the 2016 Republican Party presidential primaries.

Bell was elected by the state House Republican Caucus to the position of state House majority whip in 2014, and to the position of majority leader in 2016. Bell was also chairman of the House Regulatory Reform Committee and the House Select Committee on Wildlife Resources.

In the state House, Bell has been a supporter of restricting wind energy development, taking the position that wind farms are a threat to military bases in North Carolina because they could obstruct low-level military training flights. Bell sponsored legislation in 2013 to increase wind-energy regulation, and in 2019 helped negotiate a bill to require the state to consult military commanders as part of the state permitting process for wind farms.

Bell and other General Assembly Republicans have opposed Democratic Governor Roy Cooper on the issue of expanding Medicaid. Cooper and other Democrats support the expansion of Medicaid, and Republicans oppose it.

Bell introduced legislation in 2019 to allow the sale of beer and wine at North Carolina public universities during athletic games. The bill passed later that year, and seven University of North Carolina System institutions took advantage of the law by opting to allow alcohol sales on game days.

Electoral history

2020

2018

2016

2014

2012

Committee assignments

2021-2022 session
Agriculture 
Alcoholic Beverage Control 
Energy and Public Utilities 
Finance 
Rules, Calendar, and Operations of the House

2019-2020 session
Agriculture
Alcoholic Beverage Control
House Finance
Energy and Public Utilities

2017-2018 session
Appropriations
Agriculture
Regulatory Reform
Energy and Public Utilities
Finance
Rules, Calendar, and Operations of the House
Banking
Education - Universities
Homeland Security, Military, and Veterans Affairs

2015-2016 session
Agriculture
Regulatory Reform (Chair)
Finance
Public Utilities
Banking
Commerce and Job Development
Homeland Security, Military, and Veterans Affairs
Judiciary III

2013-2014 session
Appropriations
Agriculture (Vice Chair)
Banking
Government
Homeland Security, Military, and Veterans Affairs
Judiciary

References

External links

|-

Living people
1979 births
People from Mount Olive, North Carolina
University of North Carolina at Wilmington alumni
21st-century American politicians
Republican Party members of the North Carolina House of Representatives